Un Bien is a Caribbean restaurant with two locations in Seattle, in the U.S. state of Washington.

The first Ballard restaurant was opened on June 3, 2015, by the former staff of Paseo, which had been acquired by a new owner following a bankruptcy. Un Bien's owners are Julian and Lucas Lorenzo, the sons of original Paseo owner Lorenzo Lorenzo. A second location opened in 2016 at the site of a former Paseo branch facing Shilshole Bay in western Ballard. In 2016, Un Bien was rated by Yelp as the best restaurant in Washington through an algorithm that takes user-generated reviews and ratings into account.

Aimee Rizzo of The Infatuation described the restaurant as a "fuchsia and teal shack on the side of the road". The Caribbean roast pork sandwich is a Macrina baguette with braised pork, marinade, sweet onions, pickled jalapeño, romaine, and aioli. The menu has also included grilled chicken and roasted corn with aioli, paprika, and parmesan. Rizzo included the business in The Infatuation's 2022 list of the Seattle's 25 best restaurants.

References 

Ballard, Seattle
Caribbean cuisine
Restaurants in Seattle